The Foster Communications Coliseum is a 5,260-seat multi-purpose arena in San Angelo, Texas, built in 1959 as a home for the San Angelo Stock Show and Rodeo, the fourth largest stock show and rodeo in the United States, after its original home was destroyed in 1953. Throughout the year the coliseum is home to various concerts, trade shows and exhibits and other special events.

In March 2011, the city of San Angelo announced that it sold the naming rights of the San Angelo Coliseum to Foster Communications, thereby renaming it Foster Communications Coliseum.

References

External links
Foster Communications Coliseum

Indoor arenas in Texas
Indoor ice hockey venues in the United States
Sports venues in San Angelo, Texas
American football venues in Texas
1958 establishments in Texas
Sports venues completed in 1958